Pseudomops is a genus of cockroach in the family Ectobiidae. There are more than 40 described species in Pseudomops.

Species
These 44 species belong to the genus Pseudomops:

 Pseudomops affinis (Burmeister, 1838)
 Pseudomops albostriatus Shelford, 1906
 Pseudomops americanus (Saussure, 1869)
 Pseudomops angustus Walker, 1868
 Pseudomops annulicornis (Burmeister, 1838)
 Pseudomops aurantiacus (Saussure & Zehntner, 1893)
 Pseudomops bicolor Shelford, 1906
 Pseudomops boliviensis Princis, 1948
 Pseudomops boyacae Hebard, 1933
 Pseudomops brunneri (Saussure, 1869)
 Pseudomops burri Shelford, 1906
 Pseudomops cinctus (Burmeister, 1838)
 Pseudomops crinicornis (Burmeister, 1838)
 Pseudomops deceptura Walker, 1868
 Pseudomops dimidiatus Brullé, 1835
 Pseudomops discicollis (Burmeister, 1838)
 Pseudomops femoralis (Walker, 1868)
 Pseudomops flavipes (Burmeister, 1838)
 Pseudomops fluminensis Rocha e Silva, 1973
 Pseudomops gloriosus Hebard, 1920
 Pseudomops gratus Rehn, 1903
 Pseudomops guerinianus (Saussure, 1862)
 Pseudomops hirticornis (Burmeister, 1838)
 Pseudomops inclusus Walker, 1868
 Pseudomops interceptus (Burmeister, 1838)
 Pseudomops luctuosus (Saussure, 1868)
 Pseudomops magnifica Rocha e Silva, 1973
 Pseudomops magnus Shelford, 1906
 Pseudomops melanus Walker, 1868
 Pseudomops mimicus Walker, 1868
 Pseudomops neglectus Shelford, 1906
 Pseudomops nigrimaculis Fisk, 1977
 Pseudomops oblongatus (Linnaeus, 1758)
 Pseudomops obscurus (Saussure, 1869)
 Pseudomops petropolitanus Rocha e Silva, 1973
 Pseudomops piceus Princis, 1948
 Pseudomops praeclarus Rehn, 1928
 Pseudomops puiggarii (Bolívar, 1881)
 Pseudomops pyronotum Rehn, 1932
 Pseudomops rufescens Shelford, 1912
 Pseudomops septentrionalis Hebard, 1917 (pale bordered field cockroach)
 Pseudomops simulans Stål, 1860
 Pseudomops tristiculus Stål, 1860
 Pseudomops zonatus Rehn, 1928

References

External links

 

Cockroaches
Articles created by Qbugbot